Senator Sloan may refer to:

Charles Henry Sloan (1863–1946), Nebraska State Senate
George B. Sloan (1831–1904), New York State Senate
R. B. Sloan Jr. (fl, 2000s), North Carolina State Senate